Ardashes Saginian (16 June 1928 – 19 July 2009) was an Iranian boxer. He competed in the men's light middleweight event at the 1952 Summer Olympics.

References

1928 births
2009 deaths
Iranian male boxers
Olympic boxers of Iran
Boxers at the 1952 Summer Olympics
Place of birth missing
Light-middleweight boxers